Valley Mill is a children's day summer camp and kayaking school in Germantown, Maryland. It is accredited by the American Camp Association.

History 
Valley Mill Camp for Girls started in Colesville, Maryland in 1956 by Robert "Mr. Mac" McEwan  and May "Skipper" McEwan, and then moved to Darnestown in 1973. Many world-class paddlers have attended the camp.

Activities
Boys Side
offers activities such as kayaking, canoeing, swimming lessons, soccer, basketball, rock climbing, outdoor education, gymnastics, archery, air riflery.

Girls Side
Offers activities such as kayaking, canoeing, swimming lessons, rock climbing, outdoor education, gymnastics, archery, air riflery, arts and crafts, drama, and horseback riding.

Junior Camp (4 and 5 years old)
Offers activities such as kayaking, canoeing, swimming lessons, outdoor education, gymnastics, arts and crafts, drama, and horseback riding.

Adventure Camp
Off site trips that include kayaking, hiking, rock climbing, canoeing, and leadership

References

External links 
 Valley Mill Website

Education in Maryland
Summer camps in Maryland
1956 establishments in Maryland
Buildings and structures in Montgomery County, Maryland
Germantown, Maryland